Previously Unreleased Recordings is an album by saxophonist Sonny Stitt featuring compositions associated with Duke Ellington which was originally recorded in 1960 and released on the Verve label in 1973. On CD it can be found on Import as part of Rearin' Back / Tribute To Duke Ellington

Reception

Scott Yanow of Allmusic stated, "the results are typically swinging bop if not overly memorable. Stitt fans will want this one anyway".

Track listing 
 "It Don't Mean a Thing (If It Ain't Got That Swing)" (Duke Ellington, Irving Mills) - 5:15  
 "I'm Beginning to See the Light" (Ellington, Don George, Johnny Hodges, Harry James) - 7:00  
 "Perdido" (Ervin Drake, Hans Lengsfelder, Juan Tizol) - 5:40  
 "Sophisticated Lady" (Ellington, Mills, Mitchell Parish) - 2:02  
 "Don't Get Around Much Anymore" (Ellington, Bob Russell) - 4:33  
 "I Let a Song Go Out of My Heart" (Ellington, Mills, Henry Nemo, John Redmond) - 4:06  
 "Do Nothin' Till You Hear from Me" (Ellington, Russell) - 4:58  
 "C Jam Blues" (Ellington) - 4:27  
 "Solitude" (Eddie DeLange, Ellington, Mills) - 5:22

Personnel 
Sonny Stitt - alto saxophone, tenor saxophone tracks 1,7 and 8
Lou Levy - piano
Paul Chambers - bass
Stan Levey - drums

References 

1973 albums
Sonny Stitt albums
Verve Records albums
Albums produced by Creed Taylor